Oregon Passage is a 1957 American CinemaScope Western film directed by Paul Landres and starring John Ericson, Lola Albright, Toni Gerry and Edward Platt. Its plot follows a clash between an army lieutenant and Shoshoni natives in the Cascade Mountains region of Oregon in 1871. It is based on the novel by Gordon D. Shirreffs.

Plot
A cavalry lieutenant becomes the enemy of a Shoshone chief when he rescues an Indian maiden from the ceremonial camp.

Cast
 John Ericson as L.t. Niles Ord
 Lola Albright as Sylvia Dane
 Toni Gerry as Little Deer
 Edward Platt as Maj. Roland Dane
 Rachel Ames as Marion Erschick (as Judith Ames)
 H.M. Wynant as Black Eagle
 Jon Shepodd as Lt. Baird Dolby
 Walt Barnes as Sgt. Jed Erschick
 Paul Fierro as Nato
 Harvey Stephens as Capt. Boyson

Production
Oregon Passage was shot on location in Bend, Oregon.

References

Bibliography

External links 
 

1957 films
Films shot in Bend, Oregon
Films set in Oregon
American Western (genre) films
1957 Western (genre) films
Allied Artists films
Films based on Western (genre) novels
Films scored by Paul Dunlap
Revisionist Western (genre) films
1950s English-language films
1950s American films